Crawford is an unincorporated community in Wyandot County, in the U.S. state of Ohio.

History
A post office was established at Crawford in 1838, and remained in operation until 1920. The community was named for William Crawford (1732–1782), a soldier in American Revolutionary War who was burnt at the stake by Indians nearby.

See also
Col. Crawford Burn Site Monument

References

Unincorporated communities in Wyandot County, Ohio
1838 establishments in Ohio
Populated places established in 1838
Unincorporated communities in Ohio